Levinka is a rural locality (a selo) in Paspaulskoye Rural Settlement of Choysky District, the Altai Republic, Russia. The population was 18 as of 2016. There are 2 streets.

Geography 
The village is located east from Gorno-Altaysk, in the valley of the Malaya Isha River, 11 km southwest of Choya (the district's administrative centre) by road. Tunzha is the nearest rural locality.

References 

Rural localities in Choysky District